The 2014 Victorian state election, held on Saturday, 29 November 2014, was for the 58th Parliament of Victoria. All 88 seats in the Victorian Legislative Assembly and 40 seats in the Victorian Legislative Council were up for election. The incumbent centre-right Coalition minority government, led by Liberal Party leader and Premier Denis Napthine and National Party leader and Deputy Premier Peter Ryan, was defeated by the centre-left Labor Party opposition, led by Daniel Andrews. The Greens won two lower house seats, their first Legislative Assembly seats in a Victorian state election, whilst increasing their share of upper house seats. The new Andrews Ministry was sworn in on 4 December 2014.

Voting is compulsory in Victoria. Elections for the Legislative Assembly use instant-runoff voting (called preferential voting in Australia) in single-member electorates (called districts). Elections for the Legislative Council use partial proportional representation, using single transferable vote (also called preferential voting) in multi-member electorates (called regions). Members of the Legislative Council are elected from eight electoral regions each returning five members, making the quota for election in each region 16.67%. The election was conducted by the Victorian Electoral Commission (VEC).

The election marked the first time since 1955 that a Victorian state government had been defeated after only one parliamentary term. Furthermore, the Nationals were reduced to a total of ten seats in the Legislative Assembly and Legislative Council, one short of official status in the legislature. Following the election, both Napthine and Ryan resigned as leaders of the Liberal and National parties, respectively.

Results

Legislative Assembly

| colspan=7 |* Labor also retained four of the five Labor seats which were made notionally Liberal by the 2013 redistribution.
|}

Legislative Council

|}

Legislative Council seats

Seats changing hands
Following the election, the seats of Frankston and Prahran were initially too close to call, with around a hundred votes separating candidates. Prahran was a three-way contest between Labor, Liberal, and the Greens, and this seat proved to be the tightest contest among all the lower house seats. The VEC declared Prahran had been won by the Greens on 9 December, whereby the Greens overtook the ALP from third place, to defeat the Liberal incumbent in the final distribution of preferences. The Greens' win was confirmed in the recount held the following day.

The seats of Bellarine, Monbulk, Ripon, and Yan Yean were won by Labor at the 2010 election, but redistributions in 2013 made them notionally Liberal seats. Similarly, the redistribution largely replaced Ballarat West with Wendouree; Ballarat West was also won by Labor at the 2010 election, but notionally Liberal post-redistribution.

Key dates
Terms are fixed at four years unless dissolved earlier by the Governor. The election occurred in line with the fixed-term provisions laid out in the Electoral Act 2002.

Key dates for the election were:
 4 November: Writs issued by the Governor of Victoria
 5 November: Opening of nominations for all candidates
 13 November: Close of nominations for party candidates
 14 November: Close of nominations for independents
 29 November: Election day (polls open 8am to 6pm)

Background

The Coalition won the 2010 Victorian state election, winning 45 seats in the 88-member lower house, a swing of 12 seats, defeating the 11-year Labor government which won 43 seats.

Labor suffered a swing of 5.96 percent, a larger swing than the 1992 landslide that brought the Jeff Kennett-led Coalition to power. This led Paul Austin of the Sydney Morning Herald to speculate that Labor was headed for a long period in the political wilderness. However, by 2012, Labor had gradually whittled away a large Coalition advantage in opinion polling. By the time the writs were dropped, Labor had been leading most opinion polls for almost two years, though Andrews consistently trailed as preferred premier.

With a Coalition MP as Speaker, the government operated with a one-seat margin of 44 seats, until the resignation of Geoff Shaw, the member for Frankston, from the Liberal Party on 6 March 2013. This meant the government had only 43 votes on the floor of the parliament, equal to Labor's total. Partly due to Shaw's defection, Premier Ted Baillieu resigned later on 6 March and was succeeded as Liberal leader and Premier by Ports Minister Denis Napthine.  Shaw initially guaranteed the Napthine Government support on matters of supply and confidence, allowing it to stay in office as a minority government, although later statements indicated that he had rescinded that earlier statement and was considering assisting an ALP Opposition vote of no confidence in the Napthine administration. If this had happened, his actions could have precipitated an early state election.

The government operated with a two-seat margin in the 40-member upper house where all members are up for re-election every term, with 21 Coalition, 16 Labor and 3 Greens members.

Labor retained seats at the Broadmeadows, Niddrie, Melbourne and Lyndhurst by-elections.

Casual vacancies were created in various Legislative Council seats by the departures of Labor MPs Martin Pakula (Western Metropolitan—who moved to the Legislative Assembly seat of Lyndhurst) and Candy Broad (Northern Victoria), and Liberal MPs Donna Petrovich (Northern Victoria) and Philip Davis (Eastern Victoria). Their seats were filled by Cesar Melhem, Marg Lewis, Amanda Millar, and Andrew Ronalds respectively, each being appointed by a joint sitting of Parliament.

Registered parties
Twenty-one parties were registered with the Victorian Electoral Commission (VEC), and all fielded candidates at the 2014 state election:

 Animal Justice Party
 Australian Christians
 Australian Country Alliance
 Australian Cyclists Party
 Labor Party
 Australian Sex Party
 Democratic Labor Party of Australia
 Family First Party
 Liberal Democratic Party
 Liberal Party
 National Party

 Palmer United Party
 People Power Victoria – No Smart Meters
 Rise Up Australia Party
 Shooters and Fishers Party
 Socialist Alliance
 The Australian Greens
 The Basics Rock'n'Roll Party
 Voice for the West
 Voluntary Euthanasia Party
 Vote 1 Local Jobs

Additionally, two other parties applied for registration prior to the election, but failed to achieve registration by the deadline: No East West Link and Save the Planet.

Redistribution

A redistribution of Victoria's state electoral boundaries took place from 2012 to 2013. The final boundaries were gazetted on 17 October 2013 and were used for the 2014 state election.

Fifteen electorates were abolished, namely Ballarat East (Labor), Ballarat West (Labor), Benalla (Nationals), Clayton (Labor), Derrimut (Labor), Doncaster (Liberal), Keilor (Labor), Kilsyth (Liberal), Lyndhurst (Labor), Mitcham (Liberal), Murray Valley (Nationals), Rodney (Nationals), Scoresby (Liberal), Seymour (Liberal) and Swan Hill (Nationals).

The fifteen new seats are Buninyong (Labor, largely replacing Ballarat East), Clarinda (Labor, largely replacing Clayton), Croydon (Liberal, largely replacing Kilsyth), Eildon (Liberal, combining sections of abolished Seymour with areas of existing Gembrook), Euroa (Nationals, largely replacing Benalla), Keysborough (Labor, largely replacing Lyndhurst), Murray Plains (Nationals, largely replacing Swan Hill and parts of Rodney), Ovens Valley (Nationals, largely replacing Murray Valley), Ringwood (Liberal, largely replacing Mitcham), Rowville (Liberal, largely replacing Scoresby), St Albans (Labor, largely replacing Derrimut), Sunbury (Labor, created from parts of Macedon and Yuroke), Sydenham (Labor, largely replacing Keilor), Wendouree (Liberal, largely replacing Ballarat West), and Werribee (Labor, formed from parts of Lara and Tarneit).

Five electorates changed parties notionally with the new boundaries, including Wendouree, a notional Liberal seat created from the Labor seat of Ballarat West. According to ABC psephologist Antony Green, the Labor-held seats of Bellarine, Monbulk, Ripon and Yan Yean became notionally Liberal. This meant that Labor needed a notional five-seat swing to win government.

Issues
Much of the Labor campaign was focused on the Napthine Government's A$18 billion East West Link toll road project, which Labor opposed, and said it would halt if it won power. In early November Prime Minister Tony Abbott, in one of his few Victorian appearances for the Liberals during the campaign, described the election as "a referendum on the East West Link". Public transport also featured strongly during the campaign, with the parties presenting rival inner-city rail tunnel projects and competing plans to remove railway level crossings to ease road congestion.

With unemployment at its highest level since 2001, jobs and the economy became a key issue and both sides promised major job creation schemes: the Coalition said it would create 200,000 jobs over five years and Labor said it would create 100,000 jobs within two years. Other major issues raised during the election were the long-running Ambulance Victoria industrial dispute and slow ambulance response times, urban planning laws, education and law and order. Both major parties promised to build new and bigger hospitals.

Labor election advertising aimed to capitalise on the unpopularity of Australia's Liberal Prime Minister and unpopular federal Liberal policies, while much of the Coalition advertising depicted Andrews as a leader with close ties to the Construction, Forestry, Mining and Energy Union.

On environmental issues neither the Coalition nor Labor presented comprehensive policies, although Labor promised to repeal some of the Coalition's legislation, such as on cattle grazing in the Alpine National Park and leases in national parks. A key topic was the proposal for a new Great Forest National Park, that was opposed by the Coalition and wasn't supported by Labor. The Greens supported the new park, as well as stronger action on climate change and phase-out of coal fired power stations.

Candidates and retiring MPs

As the close of nominations on 14 November 2014, there were a total of 896 candidates in the election (a 26 per cent increase to the 711 candidates in the 2010 election). There were 545 candidates contesting the 88 seats of the Victorian Legislative Assembly (up from 501, an 8.6 per cent increase); and 351 candidates contesting the 40 seats in the Legislative Council (up from 206, a 68 per cent increase). Labor and the Greens contested every electorate. There were 92 candidates from the Liberal–National Coalition for the lower house, with four "three-cornered contests" where both Liberal and National candidates contested the same seat (Buninyong, Eildon, Euroa and Ripon).

Retiring MPs
Members who chose not to renominate are as follows:

Labor
 Ann Barker MLA (Oakleigh) – announced 25 November 2013
 Liz Beattie MLA (Yuroke) – announced 25 November 2013
 Christine Campbell MLA (Pascoe Vale) – announced 13 November 2013
 Joanne Duncan MLA (Macedon) – announced 4 November 2013
 Joe Helper MLA (Ripon) – announced 3 December 2012
 Justin Madden MLA (Essendon) – announced 15 November 2013
 John Pandazopoulos MLA (Dandenong) – announced 26 November 2013
 Ian Trezise MLA (Geelong) – announced 3 February 2014
 Kaye Darveniza MLC (Northern Victoria) – announced 29 November 2013
 John Lenders MLC (Southern Metropolitan) – announced 18 November 2013
Marg Lewis MLC (Northern Victoria) – appointed to a casual vacancy but did not contest preselection
Johan Scheffer MLC (Eastern Victoria)
 Matt Viney MLC (Eastern Victoria) – announced 15 November 2013

Liberal
 Ted Baillieu MLA (Hawthorn) – announced 22 August 2014
 Nicholas Kotsiras MLA (Bulleen) – announced 12 January 2014
 Andrew McIntosh MLA (Kew) – announced 17 December 2013
 Ken Smith MLA (Bass) – announced 13 January 2014
 Andrea Coote MLC (Southern Metropolitan) – announced 19 January 2014
David Koch MLC (Western Victoria) – announced 14 March 2014
Jan Kronberg MLC (Eastern Metropolitan) – announced 19 March 2014

National

 Hugh Delahunty MLA (Lowan) – announced 10 February 2014
 Jeanette Powell MLA (Shepparton) – announced 8 February 2014
 Bill Sykes MLA (Benalla) – announced 9 January 2014

Polling

Graphical summary

Voting intention

Better Premier and satisfaction polling

Polling that is conducted by Newspoll and published in The Australian is conducted via random telephone number selection in city and country areas. Sampling sizes usually consist of around 1100–1200 electors. The declared margin of error is ±3 percentage points.

Newspaper endorsements

Election validity court challenge
In January 2015, unsuccessful Palmer United Party candidate Maria Rigoni petitioned the Supreme Court of Victoria to declare the 2014 election invalid, alleging that the Victorian Electoral Commission had breached the Electoral Act whilst conducting the election. Rigoni argued that the unprecedented high level of early voting demonstrated that the VEC had not applied or enforced the rule requiring applicants for an early or postal votes to declare a valid reason to an electoral officer that they were unable to vote on polling day.

Lawyers acting for the VEC asked the court to dismiss the case as an abuse of process, however Justice Jack Forrest disagreed, and set the case to proceed to trial on 25 February 2015. On 24 March, Justice Gregory Garde of the Supreme Court of Victoria dismissed Rigoni's case, ruling that there was no evidence presented to the court that the VEC's early voting procedures had any effect on the result.

References

Elections in Victoria (Australia)
2014 elections in Australia
2010s in Victoria (Australia)
November 2014 events in Australia